Ian Donaldson was a Scottish amateur football goalkeeper who played in the Scottish League for Queen's Park. He was capped by Scotland at amateur level.

References

Scottish footballers
Scottish Football League players
Queen's Park F.C. players
Association football goalkeepers
Scotland amateur international footballers
Living people
Year of birth missing (living people)
Place of birth missing (living people)